One Week One Trouble is a 1972 young adult/children novel by Nigerian writer Anezi Okoro. The title of the book has been used by a journalist to describe "trouble" befalling on Nigerian politicians.

Plot summary
The novel focuses on Wilson Tagbo, a boy who got admission into secondary school. Starting from his first day, Wilson jumped from one trouble to another. And just like the title suggest, no week passes by without Tagbo getting in trouble until he finally joined the school cultists in his SSS 3 where he was finally arrested.

References

1972 Nigerian novels
Novels set in Nigeria
Children's novels
Nigerian English-language novels
1972 children's books